Charles Dionne may refer to:

 Charles-Eugène Dionne (1908–1984), Canadian member of the House of Commons
 Charles-Eusèbe Dionne (1846–1925), Canadian naturalist and taxidermist
 Charles Dionne (cyclist) (born 1979), Canadian road cyclist